Free running can refer to:

 Free running, a physical discipline created by Sebastien Foucan, which is inspired by the movements of Parkour and Tricking
 Free-running sleep is sleep with no outside regulation of its timing
 Free Running, a 2007 video game developed by Rebellion and published by Ubisoft
 Free Runners, an original English-language manga

See also 
 Freerunner (disambiguation)
 Free run (disambiguation)
 Free Runtimes